Jacqueline Novogratz (born 1961) is an American entrepreneur and author. She is the founder and CEO of Acumen, a nonprofit global venture capital fund whose goal is to use entrepreneurial approaches to address global poverty.

Early life
Novogratz was born in 1961 in the US, the eldest of seven children. Her father was a career officer and major in the U.S. Army, and her mother, Barbara, ran an antiques business.

She attended Fort Hunt High School in Alexandria, Virginia, and earned a bachelor's degree from the University of Virginia, where she studied economics and international relations. She earned an MBA from the Stanford Graduate School of Business.

Career
Novogratz started her career at Chase Manhattan Bank in 1983, as an international credit analyst. After three years, she left banking to explore how to make a difference in the world.

She worked throughout Africa as a consultant for the World Bank and for UNICEF. As a UNICEF consultant in Rwanda in the late 1980s, she helped found Duterimbere, a microfinance institution.

Novogratz founded and directed The Philanthropy Workshop and The Next Generation Leadership programs at the Rockefeller Foundation before founding Acumen in 2001. Acumen invests patient capital in businesses that provide critical goods and services to people living in poverty. It estimates that it has impacted more than 260 million people through its investments. Novogratz oversaw the development of Acumen's Fellowship program, which develop leaders for the social sector.

Novogratz serves on the Harvard Business School Social Enterprise Initiative, and UNICEF. She also serves on the Aspen Institute board of trustees, the Pakistan Business Council Centre of Excellence in Responsible Business (CERB)], is a member of the Council on Foreign Relations, and the American Academy of Arts & Sciences. Hillary Clinton, as Secretary of State, appointed Novogratz to the State Department's Foreign Affairs Policy Board.

The Blue Sweater
In 2009, Novogratz published The Blue Sweater: Bridging the Gap Between Rich and Poor in an Interconnected World. The book is a firsthand account of her journey from international banker to social entrepreneur and founder of Acumen.

The title of her book, The Blue Sweater, refers to an encounter she had in Kigali, Rwanda. Novogratz spotted a boy wearing a blue sweater. She recognized it as a sweater she had owned and given to Goodwill a decade earlier; it was hers, with her name on the tag. The encounter was an epiphany for Novogratz; her sense of the interconnectedness of our world has continued to influence her current work.

Personal life
Novogratz is married to Chris Anderson, the owner of TED Talks.

Her brothers include Michael Novogratz and Robert Novogratz.

Awards
 Forbes magazine's 100 Greatest Living Business Minds, 2017
 Forbes 400 Lifetime Achievement Award for Social Entrepreneurship, 2016
 The Resolution Project Champions Circle Award, 2016
 Asia Society Game Changer, 2014
 Bloomberg Markets 50 Most Influential in Global Finance, 2014 
 25 Most Successful Stanford Business School Graduates of All time
 University of Virginia Distinguished Alumna Award, 2013 
 Middlebury College CSE Vision Award and honorary doctorate, 2013
 Notre Dame Award for International Human Development, 2013
 Women of Concern Humanitarian Award, 2012
 Rensselaer Polytechnic Institute’s Entrepreneur of the Year Award, 2010
 Wofford College’s Sandor Teszler Award for Moral Courage and Service to Humankind in Spartanburg, SC, 2010 
 Foreign Policy's Top 100 Global Thinkers, 2009
 Daily Beast's 25 Smartest People of the Decade, 2009
 AWNY's Changing the Game Award, 2009
 Ernst & Young Entrepreneur of the Year 2008
 Rockefeller Foundation Warren Weaver Fellow
 Aspen Institute Henry Crown Fellow

Honorary degrees

 Doctor of Humane Letters New England College, 2017
 Doctor of Laws, University of Toronto, 2015
 Doctor of Humane Letters, Bard College, 2014
 Doctorate of Humane Letters, Middlebury College, 2013
 Doctor of Humane Letters, Fordham University, 2012
 Doctor of Laws, University of Notre Dame, 2011
 Doctor of Humanities, Wofford College, 2010

Works
 The blue sweater : bridging the gap between rich and poor in an interconnected world, New York Rodale 2010. 
 Manifesto for a moral revolution : Practices to Build a Better World, New York: Henry Holt and Company, 2020.

References

Living people
American chief executives of financial services companies
American economics writers
American financial analysts
American financial company founders
American women company founders
American company founders
American nonprofit chief executives
American venture capitalists
American women chief executives
Businesspeople from New York City
Social entrepreneurs
Stanford Graduate School of Business alumni
University of Virginia alumni
William Peace University alumni
World Bank people
Writers from New York City
Women financial analysts
American women investors
Women chief executives
Henry Crown Fellows
Recipients of the Four Freedoms Award
1961 births
Asia Game Changer Award winners
21st-century American businesswomen
21st-century American businesspeople
21st-century American women writers